Odd Vigestad (born 28 March 1915 in Borgund, died 19 January 1999) was a Norwegian politician for the Christian Democratic Party.

He was elected to the Norwegian Parliament from Møre og Romsdal in 1969, and was re-elected on two occasions.

On the local level he was a member of Ålesund municipality council from 1951 to 1968 as well as the terms 1971–1975 and 1983–1987. From 1963 to 1967 he was also a deputy member of Møre og Romsdal county council.

Outside politics he graduated as siviløkonom from NHH in 1941, and worked as a business school teacher in Ålesund.

References

1915 births
1999 deaths
Members of the Storting
Christian Democratic Party (Norway) politicians
Møre og Romsdal politicians
Politicians from Ålesund
Norwegian School of Economics alumni
20th-century Norwegian politicians